Major General Abdul Munim Wassel (died 17 May 2002) was the commander of the Egyptian third army during the Yom Kippur War.

External links
 https://web.archive.org/web/20090116071541/http://www.defencejournal.com/2002/nov/4th-round.htm

Egyptian generals
Egyptian people of the Yom Kippur War
20th-century Egyptian military personnel
2002 deaths
Governors of Sohag